Madak, also known as Mandak, is an Austronesian language spoken in New Ireland, Papua New Guinea. The Library of Congress subject classification uses Mandak.

References

External links 
 Kaipuleohone's Robert Blust collection includes written notes on Madak, listed in the collection as Mandak

Languages of New Ireland Province
Meso-Melanesian languages